Heywood railway station  is a request stop on the 15 in (381 mm) gauge Perrygrove Railway. The line was opened in 1996 and is a heritage railway. There is a footpath into the woods around the line from the halt.

References

External links
 Official Website

Forest of Dean
Heritage railway stations in Gloucestershire